Edward "Woody" Allen is a British record producer and singer-songwriter from Lincoln, England. He has released four studio albums, five singles and numerous remixes under the name Etherwood.

Biography 
Edward discovered drum'n'bass during the late '90s but didn't release his first production until 2012. The first recording to bear his name was a Jakwob and Etherwood remix of Lana Del Rey's "Video Games"; he also played guitar as part of Jakwob's band. He made his proper debut that November, when he appeared on Hospital Records' Sick Music 3 compilation with "Give It Up," an emotive track laced with multiple melodic keyboard lines. The similarly emotive "Spoken" was placed on Hospitality Drum & Bass 2013 in January 2013

His eponymous debut album Etherwood was released on 4 November 2013 through Hospital Records' imprint label Med School. It entered the UK Albums Chart at number 91, the UK Dance Chart at number 4 and the UK Indie Chart at number 11. Allen has also received airplay on BBC Radio 1 and 1Xtra shows. He also peaked at number four on Billboard 's "Next Big Sound" chart, and won the "Best Newcomer DJ" and "Best Newcomer Producer" awards at the 2013 D&B Arena awards. He was described by Nozstock: The Hidden Valley as "undoubtedly one of the most promising young talents in the scene today".

Allen provided guest vocals for Fred V & Grafix's song "Forest Fires", released on 16 June 2014, which entered the UK Singles Chart at number 77. He curated the first of Hospital Records' Hospital Mixtape compilation series, and Hospital Mixtape: Etherwood was released on 23 May 2014.

The lead single from Etherwood's second album, "You'll Always Be a Part of Me", was released on 16 March 2015. It was followed by the second single "Souvenirs" (feat. Zara Kershaw), which was released on 8 June 2015, and the third single "Light My Way Home" (feat. Eva Lazarus), released on 28 August 2015. His second studio album, entitled Blue Leaves, was released on 4 September 2015 and entered the UK Albums Chart at number 47.

Two singles, "Bear's Breeches" (feat. Anile) and "Fire Lit Sky" were released in 2017 before the release of his third album, "In Stillness".

Discography

Studio albums

Extended plays

Singles

As lead artist

As featured artist

Promotional singles

Other Appearances

Remixes

References

Remixers
English record producers
Living people
English drum and bass musicians
People from Lincoln, England
Year of birth missing (living people)